There are a number of Elementary schools named Monroe Elementary School:

 Monroe Elementary School (Santa Ana, California)
 Monroe Elementary School (Davenport, Iowa), NRHP-nominated and possibly NRHP-listed
 Monroe Elementary School (Monrovia, California)
 Monroe Elementary School (Norman, Oklahoma) 
 Monroe Elementary School (Boiling Springs, Pennsylvania) 
 Monroe Elementary School (Monroe, Utah) 

Also:
 Monroe Elementary School (Topeka, Kansas), is home to Brown v. Board of Education National Historic Site